Spelthorne is a local government district and borough in Surrey, England. Its council is based in Staines-upon-Thames; other settlements in the area include Ashford, Sunbury-on-Thames, Shepperton, Stanwell and Laleham.

Spelthorne borders the London Boroughs of Hillingdon, Hounslow and Richmond upon Thames to the north and east, the boroughs of Elmbridge and Runnymede in Surrey to the south, and the unitary authorities of Windsor and Maidenhead and Slough in Berkshire to the west.

History

Spelthorne appears in the Domesday Book of 1086 as Speletorne hund. on the Midelsexe pages. This covered 13 settlements; Ashford, Charlton, East Bedfont, West Bedfont, Feltham, Kempton, Hanworth, Hatton, Laleham, Shepperton, Staines, Stanwell, and Sunbury.
Hundreds dwindled in power as the medieval period drew to a close and were largely sources of revenue for certain overlords by the Tudor period, underlying freeholds and rights over their commons frequently held or divided among royalty or peers in a particular hundred. Ecclesiastical parishes assumed responsibilities for upkeep of public places and roads and apprehending wrongdoers, appointing churchwardens and constables to administer their areas.  The poor law unions assumed responsibility for indoor and outdoor relief, later including workhouses:
 Kingston Poor Law Union in the east
 Staines Poor Law Union in the west.

In 1875, Sanitary Districts were created covering England and Wales.

In 1889, Middlesex County Council was elected and formed pursuant to the Local Government Act 1888 and principally administered the area until 1965.

Under the Local Government Act 1894, in the area of the current borough responsibilities such as planning, sanitation and surface water drainage were conferred on the new bodies Staines Urban, Sunbury Urban and Staines Rural districts.

The 20th century saw the construction of the two Staines Reservoirs (1901), Queen Mary (1931), King George VI (1947), and the Wraysbury Reservoirs (1970) in what is today's borough.

In 1930, most of Staines Rural District merged into Staines Urban District, with the remainder given to West Drayton and Feltham Urban Districts.

In 1965, Staines Urban District and Sunbury-on-Thames Urban Districts were transferred to Surrey.

The Borough of Spelthorne was formed on the abolition of the urban districts and rural districts nationally in 1974.

The borough ceded a small amount of land in 1995, when Poyle was transferred to the Borough of Slough, as it was the only land outside the M25 motorway. Spelthorne, like Potters Bar and South Mimms, remained inside the Metropolitan Police District whose jurisdiction was aligned to Greater London in 2000; it then transferred to Surrey Police.

Spelthorne remains part of the Church of England Diocese of London and the Roman Catholic Archdiocese of Westminster. The rest of Surrey falls into the Anglican dioceses of Guildford and Southwark, and the Roman Catholic diocese of Arundel and Brighton.

Floods in 2014 caused internal damage to 891 (or 2.2%) of homes in Spelthorne due to record rainfall causing Thames flooding.  This compared to internal damage to more than 30% of homes in the neighbouring settlement of Wraysbury in the borough of Windsor and Maidenhead.

In August 2014 a campaign group of local business leaders called for the borough – along with others close to the capital – to be transferred from the county of Surrey to Greater London. The proposal was generally opposed, and so not tabled as a motion, by representatives in either county.

In June 2020 after the resignation of six Conservative Councillors, Spelthorne Borough fell in no overall political control (NOC) for the first time in the Borough's history. The leader of the council became Liberal Democrat Lawrence Nichols in May 2021, with the Lib Dem group ruling in coalition with one of the independent groups that coalition only controls 9 out of 39 seats on the council, so deals may need to be cut in order for their programme to get through.

Parks, lakes and the River Thames
The borough estimates it has  of parks, including, from Shepperton upstream, the Thames Path. Its sixteen main parks with recreational/sports facilities are supplemented by small greens and linear parks, such as by the River Thames.  The largest parks have woodland and flowering meadow. These support diverse and rare grasses, invertebrates and birds on a rich alluvial soil: Laleham Park and Sunbury Park.

The final great reduction of private parks was that of the early 20th century, a sale of Laleham manor demesne by the Earls of Lucan. The Jockey Club as owner of Kempton Park Racecourse is successor to the domain of the lords of the manor of Kempton – about 40% is a large nature reserve or its internal two large ponds abutting the Kempton Park Reservoirs Site of Special Scientific Interest, on Thames flood meadow.

The borough has five reservoirs, covering more than 15% of land, which apart from their main use of ensuring a stable and energy-efficient drinking water supply to London are bird reserves and in the case of the Queen Mary Reservoir, a sailing training centre. A similar percentage of land is covered by other lakes, mostly former gravel pits no longer pumped out of water.  The  River Ash, Surrey starts and ends in the Borough.

Of recognised high importance to nature is Staines Moor, which alongside Sheepwalk Lake and wetlands, Shepperton are the sites of special scientific interest (SSSI).

Two Rivers Retail Park and Elmsleigh Shopping Centre in Staines-upon-Thames.
In 2016 there were:
5,365 businesses (including retailers) in Spelthorne.
a 10 screen cinema with Dolby Digital Surround Sound.
12 miles of river frontage for picturesque walks.
65% green belt land or water – a green and blue buffer offsetting local major economic contributors Heathrow Airport and the UK motorway network

Hotels, take-aways and restaurants
Hospitality is widespread in the riverside towns and Sunbury and Staines town hubs being within  of top UK attractions: Windsor Castle, Thorpe Park, Hampton Court, Twickenham Rugby Stadium and Kew Gardens.

Transport
Staines is the borough's main station, being served by South Western Railway services to London Waterloo, Reading and Windsor & Eton Riverside.

Other land use
A January 2005 enhanced base map study by the Office for National Statistics managed to classify , 99% of land in Spelthorne. The findings of this study showed that the land use in Spelthorne was as follows:

Governance

Political oversight and policy-making
Elections for Spelthorne Borough Council are held every four years for the whole council, rather than third-of-council elections.

The 2 May 2019 Spelthorne Borough Council elections resulted in
23 Conservative councillors
8 Liberal Democrat councillors
four Labour councillors
two Green Party councillors
two Independent councillors.

The Conservative Party thus maintained their political majority.

On the 9th of June 2020, 6 Conservative Councillors, including Council leader Ian Harvey and Deputy leader Olivia Rybinski, resigned from the party, causing the Borough to fall in no overall control (NOC). This leaves the party's councillors without a governing majority for the first time in the Borough's history.

Composition

Spelthorne Borough Council management team consists of Daniel Charles Mouawad (Chief Executive), Terry Collier (Deputy Chief Executive) and Lee O'Neil (Deputy Chief Executive). The Mayor for Spelthorne is Susan Doran.

Whole council elections are held every four years.

Changes during 2019-23 term 

The 2 May 2019 Spelthorne Borough Council elections resulted in 23 Conservative seats, 8 Liberal Democrat seats, four Labour seats, two Green Party seats and two Independents. The Conservative Party thus maintained their overwhelming majority on the council.

On 9 June 2020, 6 Conservative Councillors, including Council leader Ian Harvey and Deputy leader Olivia Rybinski, resigned from the Conservative party and created the new United Spelthorne Group on the council. With the Conservatives now having fewer than half of all seats on the council, the Borough is now in "no overall control", leaving the Conservative party without a governing majority for the first time in the Borough's history.

On 25 June 2020, John Boughtflower was elected as leader of the council and Jim McIlroy as his deputy.

On 27 May 2021, Lawrence Nichols (Liberal Democrats) was elected as leader  and Joanne Sexton (Independent) as his deputy.

On 27 May 2022, John Boughtflower was elected as leader of the council and Tony Mitchell as his deputy.

On 8 March 2022, Veena Silva and Jenny Vinson - elected as Labour - disbanded the Independent Labour group to join the Breakthrough Party.

Premises
The council offices are at Knowle Green in Staines. The building was opened in 1972 for the former Staines Urban District Council, shortly before that council was abolished in 1974 to be replaced by Spelthorne Borough Council.

Executive
The Leader, co-responsible with the management team with operational management, is  John Boughtflower. The Deputy Leader is Cllr Tony Mitchell. The next elections will be in early May 2023.

The management team consists of Daniel Charles Mouawad (Chief Executive), Terry Collier and Lee O'Neil (Deputy Chief Executives).

Ceremonial matters
The Mayor of Spelthorne for the Civic Year 2022–23 is  Susan Doran.

Sport and leisure

The district has two publicly sponsored leisure centres and two private clubs with pools, and two without pools:
Sunbury and Staines Leisure Centres
the Thames Club Staines
Nuffield Health Sunbury
Pure Gym Staines
The Gym Sunbury

It has two golf courses.

School-taught English sports: cricket and football are played at many pitches; the third, rugby union is played at the London Irish Hazelwood Centre sharing pitches with London Irish Amateur Rugby Football Club in Sunbury. Staines Rugby Club play next to the Feltham-Hanworth-Sunbury tripoint in Lower Feltham.

Spelthorne has two football clubs – semi- or non-professional – as the top men's sides compete in the lower leagues:

Spelthorne hosts one of the county's major Archery Clubs, Spelthorne Archers and five lawn bowls clubs.

Fishing is open to all, subject to rod licensing, from the Thames Path National Trail and adjoining islands in Laleham and Staines as well as at lakes in Shepperton and Ashford.  One rowing club is in the borough, at Laleham, with others nearby including Staines Boat Club across Staines Bridge from the town centre which organises a regatta to Penton Hook in July for racing shells. Sunbury Skiff and Punting Club is the newest of all six which are quite clustered on the Thames, several of which incorporate dongola racing, dragon boat racing and canoeing. It organises an August regatta with fireworks.

In May the Staines 10k charity run takes place organised by two local running/'strolling' clubs and the council.  One of the more than 720 nationwide 5,000-metre running competitions of the major organiser is around the rugby union club in its borders, which has a small nature reserve it owns to one end.

Other venues hosting annual events in a range of sports are Kempton Park Racecourse and Staines Lammas Park.

Towns and villages
The stated proportion of land that is absorbed by domestic dwellings tends to be housing with gardens forming suburbs to London and otherwise has mid rise urban town centres with exceptional offices (in Staines-upon-Thames) and apartments (in Sunbury-on-Thames) which are high rise, including a minority of the social housing.

The non-urban parts, inclusive of the embanked water retaining reservoirs, are today for the most part Spelthorne's parks and lakes.  The bulk of the rest is mostly narrow buffering land being arable farming, horse-grazing meadows and sheep grazing on the reservoir embankments and fringes with Green Belt legal status. Shopping is available in each of the towns and in the village of Shepperton but not in the other small villages which are connected by road and bus to the nearby towns. Kempton Park Racecourse and Shepperton Studios are in Spelthorne. Staines is the largest town and has local government and judicial buildings. Each of the towns has libraries and schools.

In July 2017, Shepperton was named as the UK's most courteous town by the National Campaign for Courtesy.
 Staines-upon-Thames
 Sunbury on Thames
 Shepperton
 Ashford
 Laleham
 Stanwell
 Stanwell Moor
 Upper Halliford
 Charlton
 Littleton

Subsumed hamlets or manors
 Kempton
 Astleham: see Littleton, above and Queen Mary Reservoir, above.

Twinning
  Melun, France.
  Grand Port, Mauritius.

See also

 Spelthorne (UK Parliament constituency)

Notes and references
Notes
 
References

External links 
 Spelthorne Borough Council
 Brooklands College Ashford Campus

 
Non-metropolitan districts of Surrey
Local authorities adjoining the River Thames
Boroughs in England